Oviedo Express is a 2007 Spanish comedy-drama film directed and written by Gonzalo Suárez. It stars Carmelo Gómez, Aitana Sánchez-Gijón, Maribel Verdú, Najwa Nimri, Jorge Sanz, Bárbara Goenaga and Alberto Jiménez.

Plot 
The plot was reportedly inspired on Stefan Zweig's Fear, although barely anything of the work (the nexus with the intrigue if at all) is identifiable in the film. A troupe of thespians moves to Oviedo to stage a play based on La Regenta. Mariola Mayo is the leading actress performing the stage role of La Regenta/Ana Ozores. The Mayor of Oviedo has an affair with journalist Bárbara Ruiz. Emma (a nod to Madame Bovary character), the scorned spouse of the Mayor of Oviedo and a young scholar preparing a PhD dissertation on La Regenta, portrays a sort of Regenta-like in-fiction character. Emma has sexual intercourse with Benjamín Olmo, the leading actor of the play.

Cast

Production 
The project was originally titled Érase una vez Oviedo. The film was shot in Oviedo in 2006.

Release 
The film was theatrically released in Spain on 31 October 2007.

Reception 
Alberto Bermejo of El Mundo rated the film 4 out of 5 stars, writing that "above many other things, 'Oviedo Express' is very funny, even though it is much more than a comedy", with additional superimposed layers of farce, vaudeville, melodrama, and caricature, also featuring a cast of actors taking risks "in unusual registers" delivering the elaborated and "highly personal" dialogues of Gonzalo Suárez.

Jonathan Holland of Variety deemed the film to be "a typically eccentric dramedy" and (so much) "over-the-top", featuring a "bunch of fine Spanish actors overacting for all they're worth".

Accolades 

|-
| align = "center" rowspan = "8" | 2008 || rowspan = "7" | 22nd Goya Awards || Best Original Screenplay || Gonzalo Suárez ||  || rowspan = "7" | 
|-
| Best New Actress || Bárbara Goenaga || 
|-
| Best Production Supervision || Teresa Cepeda || 
|-
| Best Cinematography || Carlos Suárez || 
|-
| Best Original Score || Carles Cases || 
|-
| Best Art Direction || Wolfang Burmann || 
|-
| Best Makeup and Hairstyles || Lourdes Briones, Fermín Galán || 
|-
| 17th Actors and Actresses Union Awards || Best Film Actor in a Secondary Role || Jorge Sanz ||  || 
|}

See also 
 List of Spanish films of 2007

References

Bibliography

External links 
 Oviedo Express at ICAA's Catálogo de Cinespañol

Films shot in Asturias
Films set in Asturias
Spanish comedy-drama films
2007 comedy-drama films
2000s Spanish-language films
Films about actors
2000s Spanish films
Films directed by Gonzalo Suárez